Haltemprice (which from 1950 to 1955 was officially known as Kingston upon Hull,  Haltemprice) was a constituency in the East Riding of Yorkshire, a traditional sub-division of the historic county of Yorkshire. It  returned one Member of Parliament (MP)  to the House of Commons of the Parliament of the United Kingdom.  It was created for the 1950 general election, and abolished for the 1983 general election.

Boundaries
1950–1955: The Urban District of Haltemprice, and the County Borough of Kingston-upon-Hull wards of Pickering and St Andrew's.

1955–1983: The Municipal Borough of Beverley, the Urban District of Haltemprice, and the Rural District of Beverley. The two Kingston-upon-Hull wards were transferred to the Hull West constituency.

In the 1983 redistribution, which reflected the major local government boundary changes of 1974, this constituency disappeared. Most of it became the new seat of Beverley, while the remainder of the constituency contributed 11.6% of the new Boothferry seat.

Members of Parliament

Election results

Elections in the 1950s

Elections in the 1960s

Elections in the 1970s

In popular culture
It was the constituency of the fictional ultra-right Tory MP, Alan B'Stard, in The New Statesman, a TV series which began after the actual constituency was abolished in 1983.

References

Sources 
 Boundaries of Parliamentary Constituencies 1885-1972, compiled and edited by F.W.S. Craig (Parliamentary Reference Publications 1972)
 British Parliamentary Constituencies: A Statistical Compendium, by Ivor Crewe and Anthony Fox (Faber and Faber 1984)
 British Parliamentary Election Results 1950-1973, compiled and edited by F.W.S. Craig (Parliamentary Research Services 1983)
 Who's Who of British Members of Parliament, Volume IV 1945-1979, edited by M. Stenton and S. Lees (Harvester Press 1981)

Parliamentary constituencies in Yorkshire and the Humber (historic)
Constituencies of the Parliament of the United Kingdom established in 1950
Constituencies of the Parliament of the United Kingdom established in 1955
Constituencies of the Parliament of the United Kingdom disestablished in 1983
East Riding of Yorkshire